Four White Shirts or Breathe Deeply (Elpojiet dziļi) is a 1967 film directed by Rolands Kalniņš. The film was prevented from being screened by Soviet censors for 20 years following its release. In 2018, Four White Shirts was featured in the 2018 Cannes Classics program.

Plot 
The film centers around a telephone repairman named Cēzars Kalniņš, who writes music for his friend's rock band “Optimisti” (The Optimists). Culture worker Anita Sondore reports Kalniņš’ lyrics to the authorities due to their criticism of prevalent social values, leading to conflicts between Kalniņš, his bandmates, and the Soviet authorities.

Cast 

 Uldis Pūcītis as Cēzars Kalniņš
 Dina Kuple as Anita Sondore
 Līga Liepiņa as Bella
 Pauls Butkēvičs as Ralfs

Music 
The film's music was written by Imants Kalniņš and lyrics by the poet Māris Čaklais. The music was sung by actors Līga Liepiņa, Pauls Butkevičs, and Juris Strenga. Despite the film being informally banned for twenty years, many of the songs including “Dziesma par Napoleonu” started being played by Kalniņš’ band Menuets and became well-known hits. In 2014, music publisher ''Upe tt'' released Māris Čaklais' book ''Stikla saksofonists'' with two CDs. On the first CD, the writer reads his poetry, and the second CD includes original music from the movie. This is not only the film's first full-length movie soundtrack, but also the first music album. The tracks include:

 Viņi dejoja vienu vasaru
 Dziesma par krekliem. 1. variants
 Dziesma par Napoleonu
 Šeiks
 Dzeguzes balss
 Es esmu bagāts
 Pirmā pīle
 Dziesma par krekliem. 2. variants
 Cik mēs viens par otru zinām

Censorship and release 
The film's screening was restricted by Soviet authorities for nearly twenty years after its original premiere due to its controversial stance on censorship, not becoming widely shown until 1987. In 2018, the film was digitally restored and shown at the Cannes Film Festival by director Rolands Kalniņš in the Buñuel Hall of the Festival Castle.

Legacy 
The film has been included into the Latvian Culture Canon as one of 99 elements in recognition of its historical and cultural value, one of just twelve films.

References

External links 

 

Soviet films based on plays
Soviet drama films
Films set in Latvia
1967 films
Soviet-era Latvian films
Latvian drama films